AnimeIowa is an annual three-day anime convention held during July at the Hyatt Regency Coralville Hotel & Conference Center in Coralville, Iowa. The staff are all volunteers and the convention is run by the non-profit Mindbridge Foundation.

Programming
The convention typically offers artist alley, cosplay contests, dealers room, Maid Café, masquerade, tabletop gaming, video gaming, and video rooms. In 2011, the Maid Café benefited We Heart Japan, a charity supporting 2011 Tōhoku earthquake and tsunami victims. AnimeIowa held a fundraiser to benefit Swisher's Miracles in Motion in 2014.

History
AnimeIowa's first convention in 1997 was organized by the SFLIS Wing of Anime and Manga People (SWAMP). Technical issues occurred during the 2008 masquerade and some attendees rooms were relocated to a different hotel due to the Iowa flood of 2008. The 2011 convention occurred during the RAGBRAI bicycle ride. Cassandra Hodges was scheduled to attend the 2011 convention, but died on June 27, 2011. Iowa River Landing was used by both the RAGBRAI bicycle ride and AnimeIowa in 2015. AnimeIowa 2020 was cancelled due to the COVID-19 pandemic. The convention later held a virtual event in August.

Event history

References

External links
 
Mindbridge website

Anime conventions in the United States
Recurring events established in 1997
1997 establishments in Iowa
Annual events in Iowa
Festivals in Iowa
Tourist attractions in Johnson County, Iowa
Conventions in Iowa